Buck (formerly Buck Consultants) is a global HR benefits and human resource consulting firm controlled by H.I.G. Capital.

History 
Founded as an actuarial firm in New York City in 1916 by George B. Buck Sr., in 2016 the firm had more than 1,500 employees and affiliates in nearly 200 global locations.

Buck Consultants remained an independent organization until 1997 when it was acquired by Mellon Financial. The Buck Consultants brand name was scrapped in late 2003 when Mellon unified various business lines under the name Mellon Human Resource & Investor Solutions. Affiliated Computer Services (ACS) acquired Mellon's human resource businesses in 2005 and reintroduced the Buck Consultants brand. In 2010, Xerox acquired ACS for $6.4 billion. Buck Consultants was later rebranded as "Buck Consultants at Xerox".

At the beginning of 2017, Conduent was spun off from Xerox. Buck Consultants, which was one of the businesses spun off, was renamed Conduent HR Services.

In May 2018, Conduent announced that it would sell the Buck Consultants portion of its business to H.I.G. Capital, starting the clock on a 90-day transition period in which it hoped to complete the sale. Immediately after the close of the deal on August 13, the business became known as Buck.

Management
 Jack Freker - Chief Executive Officer
 Amy Podrasky - Chief Operating Officer
 Steve Coco - Chief Solutions Officer
 Mike Hardy - Chief Financial Officer
 Inderjit Jhajj - Chief Information Officer
 Rod Bernstein - General Counsel and Chief Human Resources Officer
 Dean Aloise - Managing Director (United States)
 David Piltz - Managing Director (United Kingdom)
 Greg Fayarchuk - Managing Director (Canada)
 Ravi Mehta - Head of Strategy and M&A

References

External links

 Buck website

Actuarial firms
Consulting firms disestablished in 2016
Consulting firms established in 1916
Human resource management consulting firms
International management consulting firms
Management consulting firms of the United States
Business process outsourcing companies
1916 establishments in New York (state)
2016 disestablishments in New York (state)